Tetragon is the seventh album by jazz saxophonist Joe Henderson, and his second to be released on the Milestone label.  It was recorded on September 27, 1967 and May 16, 1968 and features performances by Henderson with two different quartets, both with bassist Ron Carter, one with pianist Don Friedman and drummer Jack DeJohnette, the other with pianist Kenny Barron and drummer Louis Hayes. The Allmusic review by Scott Yanow states that "Highlights of this album include the title track, "I've Got You Under My Skin" and "Invitation."".

Track listing
 "Invitation" (Bronislaw Kaper, Paul Francis Webster) – 6:18  
 "R.J." (Ron Carter) – 5:38  
 "The Bead Game" (Joe Henderson) – 8:39  
 "Tetragon" (Joe Henderson) – 5:40
 "Waltz for Zweetie" (Walter Bishop, Jr.) – 4:29  
 "First Trip" (Ron Carter) – 5:15  
 "I've Got You Under My Skin" (Cole Porter) – 4:59

Personnel
Joe Henderson - tenor saxophone
Ron Carter - bass

On tracks 1-3 & 5
Don Friedman - piano
Jack DeJohnette - drums

On tracks 4, 6 & 7
Kenny Barron - piano
Louis Hayes - drums

References

1968 albums
Milestone Records albums
Joe Henderson albums
Albums produced by Orrin Keepnews